Lammers is a Dutch and Low German patronymic surname meaning "son of Lammert" (Lambert). It may refer to:

:de:Esmé Lammers (born 1958), Dutch author and film director
Frank Lammers (born 1972), Dutch television and film actor
Georg Lammers (1905–1987), German sprinter
Gustav Adolf Lammers Heiberg (1875–1948), Norwegian barrister and politician for the Labour Party
Hans Lammers (1879–1962), German jurist and prominent Nazi politician
Jan Lammers (1926–2011), Dutch sprinter
Jan Lammers, (born 1956), Dutch racing driver and team principal
John Lammers (born 1986), Canadian ice hockey player
John Lammers (born 1963), Dutch footballer
Kim Lammers (born 1981), Dutch field hockey player
:de:Lothar Lammers (1926–2012), German inventor of the six-number lottery game
Marc Lammers (born 1969), Dutch women's national field hockey team head coach
Sam Lammers (born 1997), Dutch footballer
Thorvald Lammers (1841–1922), Norwegian baritone singer, conductor, composer and biographer

See also
Albert Lammers House, house in Stillwater, Minnesota on the National Register of Historic Places
Lammers Glacier, large glacier on the east coast of Graham Land
Lammers Township, Beltrami County, Minnesota, township in Beltrami County, Minnesota, United States

Dutch-language surnames
Patronymic surnames

es:Lammers